Czerwona Wola-Kolonia  is a village in the administrative district of Gmina Słupia Konecka, within Końskie County, Świętokrzyskie Voivodeship, in south-central Poland.

References

Czerwona Wola-Kolonia